Montrouis is a coastal communal section in Haiti, located in the department of Artibonite, south of Saint-Marc. Montrouis is one of the most important beach tourism destinations in Haiti, with several well renowned hotels and resorts, including the Moulin-sur-Mer. The town is located on the Côtes-des-Arcadins, one of Haiti's longest stretches of pure white sand beaches. It is also an exceptional place for sailing and fishing.

References

Communal sections of Haiti
Populated places in Ouest (department)
Populated coastal places in Haiti